Lyclene postseriata is a moth of the subfamily Arctiinae. It was described by Jeremy Daniel Holloway in 2001. It is found on Borneo. The habitat consists of lowland and lower montane forests on limestone.

The length of the forewings is 9–10 mm.

References

Nudariina
Moths described in 2001
Moths of Asia